The Fokker D.I (company designation M.18) was a development of the D.II fighter. The D.I was also flown in Austro-Hungarian service as a fighter trainer aircraft under the designation B.III. Confusing the matter further, both the D.II and D.I arrived at the Front in German service at similar times, in July–August 1916. The main designer was Martin Kreutzer.

Design and development

Similar to the D.II, the D.I was an unstaggered single-bay, or Einstielig equal-span biplane. The upper fuselage was initially parallel with the upper wing and was fitted with the  Mercedes D.I six-cylinder water-cooled engine.
 
Control was achieved using wing-warping. The wings were also tested in twin-bay (Zweistielig) form. To improve visibility, the center section was cut back and the wings were slightly staggered and the top wing raised slightly.

These improvements were retained, and the airplane was ordered into production with an  Mercedes D.II inline engine and a single synchronized 7.92 mm (.312 in) lMG 08 machine gun. The Austro-Hungarian B.IIIs, serialled 04.11 to 04.27, retained the Mercedes D.I engine, and some were armed with a free-firing Schwarzlose MG M.07/12 machine gun mounted above the centre-section.

Operational history
Deliveries began in July 1916 and 90 D.I fighters were delivered to the German Fliegertruppen and 17 B.III fighter trainers to the Austro-Hungarian Luftfahrttruppen, eight of which were license-built by the Magyar Általános Gépgyár (MAG) in Hungary.

One Austro-Hungarian B III was experimentally fitted with a  Mercedes D.III engine. Another had ailerons instead of wing warping, and still another had long span, swept back wings.

Compared with aircraft in service at that time, such as the Albatros D.II and the Nieuport 11, this Fokker's design and performance were decidedly unimpressive, and further production did not take place.

The D.I was the basis for the Fokker D.IV.

Operators
 Austro-Hungarian Imperial and Royal Aviation Troops
 Luftstreitkräfte

Ottoman Air Force

Specifications (D.I)

See also

References

Further reading

D 01
1910s German fighter aircraft
Military aircraft of World War I
Aircraft first flown in 1916